Digimon: The Movie is a 2000 American-Japanese animated film adaptation, produced by Saban Entertainment and distributed by 20th Century Fox as part of the Digimon franchise. The film used footage from the short films Digimon Adventure (1999), Digimon Adventure: Our War Game! (2000), and Digimon Adventure 02: Digimon Hurricane Landing!! / Transcendent Evolution!! The Golden Digimentals (2000).

Production of the film began in 2000 after Fox sought to bring a feature film to the Digimon franchise. Only three seasonal short films were produced for the series in Japan, which Fox was contractually obligated to produce as one cohesive film by Toei Animation. Due to the drastically different plots and budget restraints, more than 40 minutes of scenes from the individual Japanese films were cut to save time and introduced several changes in tone, dialogue, and plot. Owing to the number of changes made, it is considered an original work by the press. 

Digimon: The Movie released worldwide on 6 October, 2000 by 20th Century Fox and was a box office success, grossing over $16 million worldwide (equivalent to over $29 million in 2022) against a production budget of $5 million. Despite negative critical reviews, the film had a more positive reception from both fans and audiences, and has since garnered a small cult following.

Plot

Angela Anaconda short 

Angela Anaconda and her friends line up to watch Digimon: The Movie, but Nannette and her friends cut in line and Mrs. Brinks blocks her view in the screen. Angela imagines herself Digivolving into Angelamon to defeat Mrs. Brinks and Nannette, before the audience all realize they are in the wrong theater and leave.

Eight Years Ago 

Tai and Kari Kamiya find a Digi-egg that appears from their computer, which hatches and Digivolves into Agumon. Agumon wanders into the night with Kari as Tai pursues them. The neighborhood watches as a Parrotmon hatches from a second Digi-egg in the sky. When Parrotmon attacks Tai and Kari, Agumon protects them by digivolving to Greymon. When Greymon is knocked out, Tai reawakens him with Kari's whistle and he defeats Parrotmon, but, following the battle, they both disappear. Those who witnessed this would later become the DigiDestined, children chosen to protect the Digital and real worlds.

Four Years Later 

An infected Digi-egg appears on the Internet and hatches into a Digimon who devours computer code, causing chaos to the world's computer systems. Izzy and Tai are warned by Gennai and a boy from Colorado called Willis, who tells them to find a way to slow the Digimon down. Their Digimon, Agumon and Tentomon, enter the internet but are no match for the newly-Digivolved Infermon. Tai tries to recruit backup, but can only reach Matt and T.K., whose Digimon are also defeated by Infermon's final form, Diaboromon.

Diaboromon duplicates himself and infects the Pentagon's computers, launching nuclear missiles at Colorado and the DigiDestined's neighborhood which will impact in ten minutes. After WarGreymon and MetalGarurumon are defeated by the multitude of Diaboromon, Tai and Matt become digital and enter their computers. Through the collective power of everyone watching, WarGreymon and MetalGarurumon are revived and DNA Digivolve into Omnimon. Omnimon destroys the Diaboromon copies and Izzy, realizing that e-mails being sent in from people around the world watching on their computers have been slowing their Digimon down, redirects them to the original Diaboromon to freeze him in place long enough for Omnimon to destroy him. The missiles are disabled, but the same virus that created Diaboromon tracks down Willis and corrupts his Digimon, Kokomon.

Present Day 
While visiting Mimi Tachikawa in New York City, T.K. and Kari witness a battle between Willis, Terriermon, and a corrupted Kokomon who tells Willis to "go back". Willis returns home to Colorado, followed by T.K. and Kari, who informs Davis, Yolei and Cody to meet them there.

Davis, Yolei and Cody hitch-hike to Colorado, where they meet Willis and Terriermon on the way. Willis reveals his history with Diaboromon and that the same virus has infected Kokomon. Willis vows that he must confront Kokomon himself, but Terriermon and Davis offer him support and solidarity. In the final battle with Kokomon's Mega form, the DigiDestined are overpowered until Kari, T.K., Angemon and Angewomon intervene. Angewomon and Angemon release Golden Digi-Eggs to Davis and Willis, allowing Veemon and Terriermon to Golden Armor Digivolve to Magnamon and Rapidmon. Kokomon de-ages all the DigiDestined, and they realize that "go back" meant to go back in time to when the virus first attacked. The two Golden Digimon are swallowed by Kokomon and destroy the virus from within, killing Kokomon in the process. After bidding the DigiDestined farewell, Willis and Terriermon find Kokomon's Digi-egg on a beach.

Voice cast

Development

Background 

Toei Animation had animation fairs every spring and summer with featurettes showcasing their current animated titles. The first Digimon short film was Digimon Adventure, directed by Mamoru Hosoda in his directorial debut and released on March 6, 1999 for the Toei Animation Spring 1999 Animation Fair. Production precedes final decisions on the 1999 television series of the same name and is subject to several conditions imposed by the Digimon media franchise executives. The event alongside Yu-Gi-Oh! short and Dr. Slump : Arale's Surprise Burn grossed .

The second short film, Digimon Adventure: Our War Game! was originally released on March 4, 2000 for the Toei Animation Spring 2000 Animation Fair and later served as the inspiration for director Mamoru Hosoda's 2009 film Summer Wars and 2021 film Belle. The event alongside One Piece : The Movie grossed .

 was released on July 8, 2000 for the Toei Animation Summer 2000 Animation Fair. It was directed by Shigeyasu Yamauchi. The film was screened in two parts, with Ojamajo Doremi #: The Movie screening in between. Only four months separated the release of Our War Game! and this production based on the current season airing in Japan; Toei Animation rejected a script initially green-lighted, considered "too sappy, too depressing" and not enough "action-oriented, pop" by the Japanese studio, a dozen scripts were elaborated and presented in a hurry. The event grossed , the movie did not meet the expected reception of fans and critics.

Pre-production 

Several animation critics speculated that Fox had wanted to replicate the success of the first two Pokémon films by releasing a feature film for Digimon as well. The only films produced for Digimon at that time were Digimon Adventure (1999), Digimon Adventure: Our War Game! (2000), and Digimon Adventure 02: Part I: Digimon Hurricane Landing!! / Part II: Transcendent Evolution!! The Golden Digimentals (2000), which were all seasonal featurette films. The films were originally planned to be released as separate theatrical films, until Fox settled on releasing them as a singular film.

Around Q2 1999, when production for the English dub of Digimon Adventure had concluded, writers Jeff Nimoy and Bob Buchholz were offered to write Digimon: The Movie while negotiating their contracts to return to write for the show's second season. Nimoy stated that he was concerned about combining the plot of Digimon Hurricane Landing!! / Transcendent Evolution!! The Golden Digimentals, particularly because of its slow pacing and introduction of eight new characters that were not in the first two films. He had proposed to Haim Saban to use the Digimon Adventure and Our War Game! and release the third film separately as a direct-to-video film or as a DVD extra. Nimoy also stated that producer Terri-Lei O'Malley suggested using Our War Game! and Digimon Hurricane Landing!! / Transcendent Evolution!! The Golden Digimentals, and releasing the first film as a DVD extra or television special, reasoning that the animation style of the first film did not match the last two. However, all suggestions were overruled and they were forced to include all three films out of contractual obligations with Toei Animation. Nimoy had been disappointed with this decision, and it was one of the factors that led him and Buchholz into leaving the writing team near the end of Digimon Adventure 02s run in North America.

Writing 

Nimoy and Buchholz first rearranged footage from Digimon Adventure, Our War Game!, and Digimon Hurricane Landing!! / Transcendent Evolution!! The Golden Digimentals to outline the overall plot of Digimon: The Movie. As Nimoy and Buchholz noticed that Digi-eggs were a recurring image in all three films, they used that to connect their narratives. After editing the footage and sending it to post-development, they began writing the script for the film. Originally, Nimoy had Tai narrate, but as Tai did not make an appearance in the third part of the movie, he changed it to Kari.

In addition, Nimoy and Buchholz rewrote Digimon Hurricane Touchdown!! / Supreme Evolution!! The Golden Digimentals to include Willis being involved in Diaboromon's creation. As the three films were respectively 20, 40, and 60 minutes long, footage was condensed to fit 85 minutes. Digimon Adventure was used as basis for the "Eight Years Ago" sequence, Our War Game! in the "Four Years Later" sequence, and Digimon Hurricane Landing!! / Transcendent Evolution!! The Golden Digimentals in the "Present Day" sequence. Digimon Hurricane Landing!! / Transcendent Evolution!! The Golden Digimentals was heavily cut, including a subplot featuring the older DigiDestined being captured and de-aged by Wendigomon.

Alongside of that, the writing is in the style of the animated series, sought to give punch and a nervier humor for Western sensibilities. When writing the jokes, Nimoy and Buchholz worked backwards by coming up with a punchline and writing the set-up later. An early version of the official website listed Willis' name as his name in the Japanese version, Wallace, until it was changed to "Willis" in the final version.

The Angela Anaconda short at the beginning of the film was later re-released as an episode in the television series titled "Good Seats" on January 15, 2001, with all dialogue mentioning Digimon removed.

Release and marketing 
Prior to the release of Digimon: The Movie, the film led to a dispute between Saban Entertainment and the Screen Actors Guild. The Screen Actors Guild negotiated for actors contracted under them to be paid residuals over home video and subsequent television broadcasts, as they felt Digimon: The Movie was considered an original work due to the dialogue deviating from the original script.

Taco Bell promoted Digimon: The Movie the summer before the film's release via a summer partnership with the franchise from July 13, 2000 to September 9, 2000. Participating restaurants offered toys and other collectibles with purchase of their kids' meals. When the film debuted in domestic theaters, a limited edition "Digi Battle" trading card was given out with every admission, with a total of 12 cards obtainable.

On March 20, 2019, The Walt Disney Company acquired the distribution rights to Digimon: The Movie as part of their acquisition of 21st Century Fox (which reunited 20th Century Fox with the Fox Kids/Saban Entertainment library).

Reception

Box office 
Digimon: The Movie opened at #5 in the box office (being shown in 1,825 theaters) and earned $4,233,304 on the opening weekend. The film's run ended on December 3, 2000 at #56 drawing in a weekend gross of $19,665 grossing a total of $9,631,153 domestically. The movie also drew in $1,567,641 in the UK after its release on February 16, 2001 and $2,200,656 in Germany the same year.

The international success of Digimon: The Movie led Toshio Suzuki to contact Mamoru Hosoda to direct Howl's Moving Castle, though he later left the production due to creative differences. Digimon: The Movie is, over twenty-two years after its release, Hosoda's most successful film in the United States.

Critical reception 
The film received generally negative reviews by critics. According to the review aggregator website Rotten Tomatoes, 24% of critics have given the movie a positive review based on 41 reviews, with an average rating of 4/10. The site's critics consensus reads, "Digimon is better than Pokemon, but it's still a predictable movie with mediocre animation." On Metacritic, the film has a weighted average score of 20 out of 100 based on 17 critics, indicating "generally unfavorable reviews". Lawrence van Gelder of The New York Times describes the film as "noisy and ill-conceived", as it focused too much on "morphing monsters" and too little on "storytelling talent" and animation. Liam Lacey of The Globe and Mail gave the film two stars, noting that the "scenes alternate between kitschy cuteness and spectacular violence, with only a nod toward plot, character development, and motivation". Paul Trandahl from Common Sense Media gave the movie three stars, complimenting the film's visuals, but cited criticism in its lack of emotional attachment towards the characters and the plot alienating parents and newcomers.

At the 2000 Stinkers Bad Movie Awards, the film won the award for "Worst Achievement in Animation". However; the magazine Animage conducted a list of the "Top 100" anime productions in January 2001, and Digimon: The Movie placed 88th on list.

Posterity 
Despite the film's production struggles and negative critical reception, audience and fan response to the film has been more positive. It continues to generate articles, reviews, memes, urban legends, and fads on social networks counting a few thousand engagements. "The film has a life of its own now. [...] I’m so proud it keeps finding an audience. That’s all a filmmaker can ask for", said Jeff Nimoy in October 2020.

Writing for IGN Southeast Asia, Dale Bashir highlights some aspects of the film's production value stating, "Now is Digimon: The Movie better than the three movies it was adapting from? No, not even in the slightest. That doesn’t mean this movie cannot stand on its own merits, especially as a great case study into the art of dubbing and adapting foreign media into English." Nick Valdez for ComicBook also compliments aspects of the dub stating, "Because anime dubbing and licensing is handled far differently these days, Digimon: The Movie is not something that can be made again. [...] At this point, even the criticisms for the film are praises because now fans know all about its behind-the-scenes shenanigans. [...] The flaws are now a loving showcase to anime licensing from 20 years ago, and its best moments are still fondly recognized to this day." 

The ska punk-influenced soundtrack has been singled out particularly, with many outlets and reviewers claiming it as best aspect of the whole film. IGN deemed the soundtrack, "memorable", with CBR also claiming, "it's almost a perfect time capsule of the 2000's."

In January 2022, for the release of Belle, Mamoru Hosoda expressed that whenever he promotes a new project abroad, he now meets many people who grew up with Digimon and who talk about the movie, "seen in many countries", and that these meetings are "a pleasure [...] a very nice experience".

Soundtrack 

Music from the Motion Picture Digimon: The Movie is the original motion picture soundtrack for the film, Digimon: The Movie, released September 19, 2000 on Maverick Records on CD and compact cassette. The film score was composed by Shuki Levy, Udi Harpaz and Amotz Plessner, and was performed by the Israel Philharmonic Orchestra.

The film's theme song is the "Digi Rap", a remix of the theme song from the English version of Digimon Adventure. The track is performed by Josh Debear under the name "M.C. Pea Pod" and Paul Gordon.

See also 
 Digimon
 Digimon Adventure
 Digimon Adventure 02
 Digimon Adventure tri.
 List of Digimon films

Notes

References

External links 
 
 
 
 

Digimon films
2000 anime films
20th Century Fox animated films
20th Century Fox films
American action adventure films
American fantasy action films
American children's animated adventure films
American children's animated fantasy films
American remakes of Japanese films
Saban Entertainment films
Films set in the 1990s
Films set in the 2000s
Animated films set in New York City
Films set in Colorado
Films set in Japan
Fox Kids
Films directed by Mamoru Hosoda
Compilation films
2000s English-language films
2000s American films